

Helmut Bechler (2 June 1898  – 9 January 1971) was a German general in the Wehrmacht during World War II who commanded the 85. Infanterie-Division. He was a recipient of the Knight's Cross of the Iron Cross of Nazi Germany.

Awards and decorations

 German Cross in Gold on 19 December 1941 as Major in the I./Infanterie-Regiment 29
 Knight's Cross of the Iron Cross on 26 March 1944 as Oberst and commander of Grenadier-Regiment 504

References

Citations

Bibliography

 
 

1898 births
1971 deaths
People from Lengenfeld
People from the Kingdom of Saxony
Major generals of the German Army (Wehrmacht)
German Army  personnel of World War I
20th-century Freikorps personnel
Recipients of the clasp to the Iron Cross, 1st class
Recipients of the Gold German Cross
Recipients of the Knight's Cross of the Iron Cross
Military personnel from Saxony